The Mitropa Futsal Cup is an annual futsal competition and considered one of the most important European futsal tournaments. It is a preparation tournament for the UEFA Futsal Cup and takes place every year at a different venue in Central Europe. The name derives from the famous Mitropa Cup football competition, which was played between 1927 and 1992. The Mitropa Futsal Cup has been played since 2009 and features the best teams as well as national futsal champions from Austria, Hungary, Slovenia, Slovakia, Croatia, Serbia, Germany, Poland and the Czech Republic.

The most successful club is Futsal Klub Era-Pack Chrudim with 5 titles.

Mitropa Futsal Cup winners

Performances

By club

By country

See also 
UEFA Futsal Cup
Austrian Futsal Liga
Stella Rossa Wien

References

External links 
 Mitropa Futsal Cup
 Mitropa Futsal Cup 2013 at Laola1.tv
 Wackersdorf tournament report of the Mitropa Futsal Cup 2016
 FK ERA-PACK Chrudim

Futsal competitions in Europe
2009 establishments in Europe